The swollen-headed conger eel, Bassanago bulbiceps, is a conger of the family Congridae, found on continental slopes around southern Australia and New Zealand. Its length is between 40 and 60 cm.

References

 
 
 Tony Ayling & Geoffrey Cox, Collins Guide to the Sea Fishes of New Zealand,  (William Collins Publishers Ltd, Auckland, New Zealand 1982) 

Congridae
Fish described in 1948